Brok  is a town in Ostrów Mazowiecka County, Masovian Voivodeship, Poland. As of December 2021, it has a population of 1,876.

Sights
The heritage sights of Brok include the Gothic-Renaissance Saint Andrew church, two preserved historic windmills, ruins of the Bishops' Castle, the town hall and various historic houses. There are also monuments to Polish statesman and leader Józef Piłsudski and to Polish naturalist and inventor, one of the fathers of ergonomics, Wojciech Jastrzębowski.

Transport
Brok is located at the intersection of the Polish National road 50 and Voivodeship road 694. Additionally, the S8 highway runs nearby, northwest of the town.

Notable people
 Nahum Stutchkoff (1893–1965), Yiddish-Polish and later Yiddish-American actor, author, lexicographer, and radio host

Gallery

References

External links
Official town and commune webpage
Jewish Community in Brok on Virtual Shtetl

Cities and towns in Masovian Voivodeship
Ostrów Mazowiecka County
Łomża Governorate
Warsaw Voivodeship (1919–1939)